Logfia is a genus of herbaceous plants in the tribe Gnaphalieae of the family Asteraceae, known as cottonrose.

Some cottonrose species were formerly classified under the genera Filago and/or Oglifa.

Species
The following species are recognised in the genus Logfia:
 Logfia clementei (Willk.) Holub — Canary Islands, southern Spain, Morocco and Algeria. 
 Logfia gallica (L.) Coss. & Germ. — narrowleaf cottonrose;  native to Macaronesia, Europe to Mediterranean and Caucasus. Introduced to Great Britain, western U.S. and Mexico, and  Australia 
 Logfia heterantha (Raf.) Holub — Corsica, Sardinia, Sicily and north-western Africa.
 Logfia minima (Sm.) Dumort.  — small cudweed; native to Macaronesia, Europe and north-western Africa. Introduced to the United States.

References

External links
USDA Plants Profile for Logfia (field cottonrose)

Asteraceae genera
Gnaphalieae